"Final Frontier" is the solo debut single by MC Ren released from his debut EP, Kizz My Black Azz and his first track released after the breakup of N.W.A. It was released on September 14, 1992 and was produced by Bobby "Bobcat" Ervin of the L.A. Posse. Though the song was only a minor success, making it to 80 on the Hot R&B/Hip-Hop Singles & Tracks and 17 on the Hot Rap Singles, it has arguably become MC Ren's most well known song.

It has also appeared on the compilations, The N.W.A Legacy, Vol. 1: 1988–1998, Ruthless Records Tenth Anniversary: Decade of Game and Family Tree. The songs samples the Boogie Down Productions song, "The Bridge Is Over".

Single track listing
"Final Frontier" (Clean)- 4:10  
"The Final Frontier" (Uncensored)- 4:09

Charts

References

Ruthless Records singles
Songs written by MC Ren
1992 debut singles
MC Ren songs
Gangsta rap songs
1992 songs
Songs written by DJ Bobcat